Sheikh Saqer Bin Humaid Al Qasimi Sheikh Saqer served in the military and also has extensive experience in commodity and money markets. He holds a bachelor's degree in Finance from Chico State University, California in the United States. He has been a member of the board of directors of Julphar since 2005. In April 2019 he was appointed Chairman of Julphar.

References

Living people
Year of birth missing (living people)
Place of birth missing (living people)
Nationality missing
United Arab Emirates Army officers
California State University, Chico alumni
Chairpersons of corporations